Jordan Blackmon Montgomery (born December 27, 1992), nicknamed "Gumby”, is an American professional baseball pitcher for the St. Louis Cardinals of Major League Baseball (MLB). He made his MLB debut in 2017 with the New York Yankees. Before his professional career, Montgomery played college baseball for the South Carolina Gamecocks.

Amateur career
Montgomery attended Sumter High School in Sumter, South Carolina. He played for the school's baseball team, and was named the state's player of the year as a senior. Montgomery enrolled at the University of South Carolina, and played college baseball for the South Carolina Gamecocks baseball team. He was named Southeastern Conference Freshman of the Week on April 9, 2012, and a Freshman All-American.

Professional career

New York Yankees (2014–2022)
The New York Yankees selected Montgomery in the fourth round, with the 122nd overall selection, of the 2014 Major League Baseball draft. He signed with the Yankees, receiving a $424,000 signing bonus. He pitched for the Gulf Coast Yankees of the Rookie-level Gulf Coast League and the Staten Island Yankees of the Class A-Short Season New York–Penn League, pitching to a 1–1 record with a 3.79 ERA in 19 innings, as the Yankees limited his workload after the college season. In 2015, he began the season with for the Charleston RiverDogs of the Class A South Atlantic League. The Yankees promoted him to the Tampa Yankees of the Class A-Advanced Florida State League in June. Montgomery began the 2016 season with the Trenton Thunder of the Class AA Eastern League and was promoted to the Scranton/Wilkes-Barre RailRiders of the Class AAA International League in August. He pitched in the Triple-A National Championship Game, earning the win.

Montgomery received a non-roster invitation to spring training in 2017, and competed for a job in their Opening Day starting rotation. After starting the season at Triple-A for the Scranton/Wilkes-Barre RailRiders, the Yankees promoted Montgomery to the major leagues on April 12, 2017.  In his major league debut against the Tampa Bay Rays, Montgomery received a no-decision as he allowed three runs (two earned) in  innings, striking out seven. On April 17, in his second major league start, Montgomery earned his first major league win against the Chicago White Sox. On June 9 against the Baltimore Orioles, Montgomery pitched a career-high seven innings and struck out a career-high eight batters. Montgomery tied those same career highs in a June 26 start against the White Sox. Prior to the All-Star Break, Montgomery pitched to a 3.65 ERA, striking out 87 batters in  innings. On July 25, against the Cincinnati Reds, Montgomery took a no-hitter into the sixth inning before Scott Schebler hit a double to break up the bid. On August 6, he was optioned to Triple-A. He was recalled on August 11 after CC Sabathia suffered a knee injury. On August 12, Montgomery was struck in the head by an errant foul ball during batting practice while signing autographs prior to the game; he was not seriously hurt. In 29 starts in 2017, Montgomery finished with a 9–7 record and a 3.88 ERA.

On May 1, 2018, Montgomery left a game against the Houston Astros after one inning due to elbow tightness. He went on the disabled list the next day with a flexor strain and he would miss six to eight weeks. However, on June 5, it was announced that Montgomery tore his ulnar collateral ligament while throwing on flat ground during rehab a few days prior and would undergo Tommy John surgery, ending his season. In six starts in 2018, Montgomery finished with a 2–0 record and a 3.62 ERA.

Montgomery started the 2019 season on the 60-day injured list while still recovering from the previous season's surgery. He returned to the Yankees on September 15. In 2020, Montgomery pitched to a 5.11 ERA with 47 strikeouts in 44 innings pitched, while on defense he led all AL pitchers in errors, with three. In 2021, Montgomery had a 6–7 record and 3.83 ERA in  innings.

St. Louis Cardinals (2022–present)
The Yankees traded Montgomery to the St. Louis Cardinals for Harrison Bader and a player to be named later or cash considerations on August 2, 2022. He made his Cardinal debut on August 6, throwing five scoreless innings before being taken out due to cramping caused by dehydration, versus the Yankees in 1-0 win for the Cardinals at Busch Stadium. On August 22, 2022, Montgomery pitched his first complete game in the major leagues, a one-hit shutout against the Chicago Cubs.

On January 13, 2023, Montgomery agreed to a one-year, $10 million contract with the Cardinals, avoiding salary arbitration.

Personal life
Montgomery is a Christian and has two older brothers. He earned the nickname "Gumby" in college after a senior baseball player used it to make fun of his long limbs and lack of coordination. His wife, Mckenzie, studies at the Medical University of South Carolina.

References

External links

1992 births
Living people
Sportspeople from Sumter, South Carolina
Baseball players from South Carolina
Major League Baseball pitchers
New York Yankees players
St. Louis Cardinals players
South Carolina Gamecocks baseball players
Gulf Coast Yankees players
Staten Island Yankees players
Charleston RiverDogs players
Tampa Yankees players
Trenton Thunder players
Scranton/Wilkes-Barre RailRiders players